Sunshine Peak is a fourteen thousand foot mountain peak in the U.S. state of Colorado. It rises on the north side of the Lake Fork of the Gunnison River.

Sunshine Peak has the dubious distinction of being the lowest of Colorado's 53 fourteeners. However it has more and steeper local relief than many of the other fourteeners.

See also

List of mountain peaks of Colorado
List of Colorado fourteeners

References

External links

 

Mountains of Colorado
Mountains of Hinsdale County, Colorado
Fourteeners of Colorado
North American 4000 m summits